Daniel Bowling (13 February 1899 – 22 December 1973) was a British boxer. He competed in the men's bantamweight event at the 1920 Summer Olympics.

References

1899 births
1973 deaths
British male boxers
Olympic boxers of Great Britain
Boxers at the 1920 Summer Olympics
Place of birth missing
Bantamweight boxers